Ivan Carlos França Coelho (born 6 December 1989) is a Brazilian professional footballer who plays as a striker.

Career
He made his debut in the Liga 1 on 17 April 2017, where he scored one goal.

References

External links
 
 

Brazilian footballers
Living people
Brazilian expatriate footballers
1989 births
Association football forwards
Hanthawaddy United F.C. players
Persela Lamongan players
Persija Jakarta players
Alki Oroklini players
AEL Limassol players
Sri Pahang FC players
Myanmar National League players
Liga 1 (Indonesia) players
Malaysia Super League players
Cypriot First Division players
Expatriate footballers in Myanmar
Expatriate footballers in Indonesia
Expatriate footballers in Cyprus
Expatriate footballers in Malaysia
Brazilian expatriate sportspeople in Myanmar
Brazilian expatriate sportspeople in Indonesia
Brazilian expatriate sportspeople in Cyprus
Brazilian expatriate sportspeople in Malaysia